Dulal Guha (1929–2001)  was an Indian film director of Bollywood films in the 1960s and '70s. He was born in Barisal city. His father Ruhini Guha died when he was one month old after which he was cared for by his uncle Harendra Lal Guha.
He directed many films with Dharmendra as hero and was instrumental in giving Dharmendra his garam-dharam image through the blockbuster film Pratigya (1975)

Filmography
 Ek Gaon Ki Kahani (1956)
 Chand Aur Suraj (1965)
 Izzat (1968)
 Jyoti (1969)
 Dharti Kahe Pukarke (1969)
 Mere Humsafar (1970)
 Dushman (1972)
 Dost (1974)
 Pratigya (1975)
  Do Anjaane (1976)
  Khaan Dost (1976)
 Dil Kaa Heera (1979)
 Dhuan (1981)
 Do Dishayen (1982)
 Mera Karam Mera Dharam (1987)
 Sagar Sangam (1988)

References

1929 births
2001 deaths
Hindi-language film directors
20th-century Indian film directors